Yvonne Maria Therèse van Gennip (born 1 May 1964) is one of the most successful female Dutch all-round speed skaters. Her main success dates from the 1988 Winter Olympics in Calgary, where she unexpectedly won three gold medals. She was the most successful athlete at the 1988 Winter Olympics, along with Matti Nykänen of Finland.

After she had injured her foot, and had surgery less than two months before the games, the East German women were heavily favoured to win the distances over 500 meters. But Van Gennip smashed the world record by almost five seconds to win the 3000 metres, beat her personal record by almost 4 seconds to win the 1500 metres, and was almost seven seconds faster than her own world record time to win the 5000 metres as well.

Van Gennip participated in the 1984 Winter Olympics in Sarajevo and in the 1992 Winter Olympics in Albertville as well, but did not win a medal. She won a silver medal in the 1988 World Speed Skating Championships, and bronze medals in the 1987 and 1989 World Championships.

Early life 
Van Gennip was born on 1 May 1964 in Haarlem, the daughter of Johannes Gerardus van Gennip (22 April 1922 – 30 September 1999) and Reina Elisabeth Mettes (20 May 1924 – 15 March 2013).

She married bank director Gert van Kuijk on 15 August 2002 in Zandvoort, the couple divorced in 2009. Since 2010 she has been in a relationship with Jaap de Groot, lead editor for sports for De Telegraaf.

Records

Personal records

World records

Achievements

See also
 List of multiple Olympic gold medalists at a single Games

References

External links 

 
 

1964 births
Dutch female speed skaters
Speed skaters at the 1984 Winter Olympics
Speed skaters at the 1988 Winter Olympics
Speed skaters at the 1992 Winter Olympics
Olympic speed skaters of the Netherlands
Olympic gold medalists for the Netherlands
Olympic medalists in speed skating
Sportspeople from Haarlem
Living people
Medalists at the 1988 Winter Olympics
World Allround Speed Skating Championships medalists
20th-century Dutch women
21st-century Dutch women